Ingegerd Troedsson (5 June 1929 – 3 November 2012) was a Swedish Moderate Party politician. She served as the first female Speaker of the Riksdag.

She was born in Vaxholm and was elected to the Riksdag in 1974. She had a junior role in the non-socialist government of 1976, as deputy Minister for Social Affairs 1976–78. In 1979 she was elected vice speaker of the Riksdag, a post she held until 1991 when, after the Moderate election victory, she was elected the first female speaker of the Swedish Riksdag.

She was a candidate for party leader in 1986 – after Ulf Adelsohn had resigned – but lost to Carl Bildt. Instead, she was elected deputy chairman – a position she held until 1993.

References

Further reading
 

1929 births
2012 deaths
Members of the Riksdag from the Moderate Party
Speakers of the Riksdag
Swedish Ministers for Social Affairs
Women members of the Riksdag
Women government ministers of Sweden
Women legislative speakers
Members of the Riksdag 1974–1976
Members of the Riksdag 1976–1979
Members of the Riksdag 1979–1982
Members of the Riksdag 1982–1985
Members of the Riksdag 1985–1988
Members of the Riksdag 1988–1991
Members of the Riksdag 1991–1994
20th-century Swedish women politicians